The Savile Club is a traditional London gentlemen's club founded in 1868. Located in fashionable and historically significant Mayfair, its membership, past and present, include many prominent names.

Changing premises
Initially calling itself the New Club, it grew rapidly, outgrowing its first-floor rooms overlooking Trafalgar Square at 9 Spring Gardens and moving to the second floor. It then moved to 15 Savile Row in 1871, where it changed its name to the Savile Club, before lack of space forced the club to move again in 1882, this time to 107 Piccadilly, a building owned by Archibald Primrose, 5th Earl of Rosebery. With its views over Green Park, it was described by the members as the "ideal clubhouse". However, after 50 years' residence, demolition of the building next door to create the Park Lane Hotel caused the old clubhouse such structural problems that, in 1927, the club moved to its present home at 69 Brook Street in Mayfair, a house built with leases granted by the Duke of Westminster in the mid-1720s. In 1850, Edward Digby, 2nd Earl Digby commissioned Thomas Cundy II to add the Doric porch to No 69, satisfying a Victorian desire for greater privacy as well as warmth.  This was the former home of "Loulou" Harcourt, 1st Viscount Harcourt, a Liberal Party cabinet minister. The building, a combination of 69 and 71 Brook Street, owes its extravagant Dix-huitième interior to Walter Burns, the brother-in-law of financier J. P. Morgan, who commissioned William Bouwens van der Boijen of Paris to adapt it for his wife Mary to entertain in a suitable style. It thus includes an elegant hall, a grand staircase and a lavish ballroom.

Savilians
Savile Club members are known as Savilians and the Club's motto of Sodalitas Convivium implies convivial companionship. The traditional mainstays of the Savile are food and drink, good conversation, playing bridge and poker, and Savile Snooker. This is a 19th-century version of the game, whose rules were first written down in the mid-20th century by Stephen Potter. It is a form of volunteer snooker, with some unusual features (the brown ball is spotted behind baulk on the opposite equivalent of the black spot, and counts eight; yellow and green are not used, "push shots" are allowed, fouling a ball with one's tie has no penalty, and sinking two reds at once means a score of two, for example).

The dining room includes two long club tables, derived from the Club's original table d'hôte (a contrast to the contemporary habit of other clubs, where members tended to eat à la carte at small separate tables). In the Victorian period, the Savile was known for its freedom of conversation and conviviality.

Evolution
Some traditions have been lost: regular cigar club dinners went with the smoking ban, but have since been revived in memoriam on the terrace (weather permitting); "the penny game" (a form of bowls, using coins rolled down grooves in the banisters of the grand curving staircase), disappeared with decimalisation; Friday-night candlelit dinners in the Ballroom for wives and girlfriends disappeared with changes in fashions and attitudes. The musical tradition continues, with informal lunchtime and evening concerts, jazz evenings, sponsorship of music students and an annual St Cecilia's Day concert, where Club members perform. A strong science connection has been revived with regular "Science at the Savile" talks. Other traditions have evolved: the preferred dress is still jacket and tie, but the code has been relaxed slightly to allow for the less formal attire worn in offices today; mobile phones are generally banned but can be used in the Club's old telephone area.

Prominent members

Acting and the theatre
Michael Croft, OBE
Robert Donat
Valentine Dyall
Jimmy Edwards, DFC
Edward Fox, OBE
Kenneth Haigh
Sir Henry Irving
Braham Murray, OBE
Simon Oates
Sir Ralph Richardson
Bill Simpson
Simon Ward

Art, illustration and cartoons
Michael Ayrton
Sir Max Beerbohm
Vaughan Grylls
George Percy Jacomb-Hood, MVO
Sir David Low
John Merton
Major Sir William Orpen, KBE, RA, RHA
John Reinhard Weguelin, RWS, ROI
Victor Weisz ("Vicky")

Broadcasting and journalism
Sidney Bernstein, Baron Bernstein of Leigh
Colin Brazier
Sir Clement Freud
Stephen Fry
Val Gielgud
Gilbert Harding
Patrick Kidd
Quentin Letts
Tony Miles
Michael Molloy
Roy Plomley, OBE
Robert Robinson
Petroc Trelawny
Sir Huw Wheldon, OBE, MC

Films
Sir Michael Balcon
Sir Charlie Chaplin, KBE (temp. Hon. Member in 1956)
Joseph McGrath
Gareth Neame, OBE, DL
Ronald Neame, CBE, BSC
Michael Powell
Emeric Pressburger

History and the military
Freddie Spencer Chapman, DSO, ED
Erasmus Darwin IV
Niall Ferguson
M. R. D. Foot, CBE, TD
Peter Hennessy, Baron Hennessy of Nympsfield, FBA
Colonel T. E. Lawrence, CB, DSO (temp. Hon. Member in Dec 1918)
Major General Sir William Macpherson, KCMG, CB
Frederick Courteney Selous, DSO
Admiral George Pirie Thomson
Hugh Trevor-Roper, Baron Dacre of Glanton, FBA

Mathematics and computing
Arthur Benjamin
William Clifford, FRS
Karl Pearson, FRS
John Venn, FRS

Medicine
Sir Frederick Grant Banting, KBE, MC, FRS (Hon. Member in 1932)
Sir Bryan Donkin
George Fayad
Sir Frederick Gowland Hopkins, OM, PRS
Charles Rycroft

Music
William Alwyn, CBE
Richard Arnell
Sir Malcolm Arnold, CBE
Martin James Bartlett
Sir Adrian Boult, CH
Sir Edward Elgar, 1st Baronet, OM, GCVO
Ron Goodwin
Gavin Henderson, CBE
Bernard Herrmann
Herbert Howells, CH, CBE
Robin Legge
Andrew Lloyd Webber, Baron Lloyd-Webber, Kt
Muir Mathieson, OBE
Sir Hubert Parry, 1st Baronet
André Previn, KBE
John Scott
Sir Charles Villiers Stanford
Virgil Thomson
Sir William Walton, OM

Politics and political theory
Leo Abse
Arthur Balfour, 1st Earl of Balfour, KG, OM, PC, FRS, FBA, DL
Humphry Berkeley
James Bryce, 1st Viscount Bryce, OM, GCVO, PC, FRS, FBA
Bernard Coleridge, 2nd Baron Coleridge
Sir Bernard Crick
H. A. L. Fisher, OM, PC, FRS, FBA
Sir Charles Dilke, 2nd Baronet, PC
William Edward Forster, PC, FRS
Arnold Goodman, Baron Goodman, CH
George Goschen, 1st Viscount Goschen, PC, DL, FBA
Frederick Hamilton-Temple-Blackwood, 3rd Marquess of Dufferin and Ava, DSO, PC
Sir William Harcourt, KC
David Hardman
Jerry Hayes
Bryan Magee 
Charles McLaren, 1st Baron Aberconway, PC, QC, JP
John Morley, 1st Viscount Morley of Blackburn, OM, PC, FRS, FBA
Walter Morrison
Stafford Northcote, 1st Earl of Iddesleigh, GCB, PC, FRS
David Young, Baron Young of Graffham, CH, PC, DL

Science
Francis William Aston, FRS
Sir James Chadwick, CH, FRS
John Douglas Cockroft, OM, KCB, CBE, FRS
Sir Cyril Norman Hinshelwood, OM, PRS 
Edward Williams Morley
Walter Hermann Nernst, FRS (club resident in 1912)
Ernest Rutherford, 1st Baron Rutherford of Nelson, OM, FRS
John William Strutt, 3rd Baron Rayleigh, OM, PC, PRS

Writing
Richard Adams
Sir J. M. Barrie, 1st Baronet, OM
Algernon Blackwood, CBE
Sir Malcolm Bradbury, CBE
Charles Hallam Elton Brookfield
John le Carré (David Cornwell) 
Erskine Childers, DSC
Count Michael de la Bédoyère
Maurice Druon
James Fisher
Sir William Golding, CBE
Winston Graham, OBE
Patrick Hamilton
Thomas Hardy, OM
Sir H. Rider Haggard, KBE
Sir A. P. Herbert, CH
E. W. Hornung
Henry James, OM
M. R. James, OM, FBA
Rudyard Kipling
Eric Linklater, CBE
Sir Compton Mackenzie, OBE
A. A. Milne
Frank Muir, CBE
Stephen Potter
J. B. Priestley, OM
John Pudney
Anthony Sampson
Sir Stephen Spender, CBE
C. P. Snow, Baron Snow, Kt, CBE
Robert Louis Stevenson
Evelyn Waugh
H. G. Wells
W. B. Yeats
James Sully

Other occupations
 Colonel Eustace Balfour (architecture)
 John Browne, Baron Browne of Madingley, FRS (industry)
 Stanley Kalms, Baron Kalms of Edgware (industry)
 Sir Sidney Colvin (museums)
 Mandell Creighton (CoE bishop)
 C. B. Fry (sports)

Fictitious members of the Savile Club include Bill Haydon, the aristocratic polymath and British intelligence agent at the heart of John le Carré's novel Tinker Tailor Soldier Spy, and William French, wine merchant and Master of Wine (failed), in Alexander McCall Smith’s The Dog Who Came in from the Cold.

See also
List of gentlemen's clubs in London

References

Bibliography

Garrett Anderson, "Hang Your Halo in the Hall!": The Savile Club from 1868 (The Savile Club, 1993)
 Anon, The Savile Club 1868–1958 (privately printed for members of the Club, c. 1958)
Anon, The Savile Club 1868–1923 (privately printed for the committee of the Club, 1923)
Robin McDouall, Clubland Cooking (Phaidon Press, 1974)
Clive Aslet, Seduced by the dix-huitième: 69-71, Brook Street, Mayfair W1, the Home of the Savile Club (Country Life, 2014)
Amy Milne-Smith, London Clubland: A Cultural History of Gender and Class in Late-Victorian Britain (London: Palgrave Macmillan, 2011). .

Matthew Parris, Great Parliamentary Scandals (Robson Books, 1995)

External links
Savile Club Website

Gentlemen's clubs in London
Buildings and structures in the City of Westminster
1868 establishments in the United Kingdom